The SLZ Group AG is a privately held corporation providing financial services and investment strategies for various funds, the company has his headquarters in Geneve, Switzerland.

The company formerly known as Eagle Fund from 1996 till 2007 has adopted the new name The SLZ Group AG in 2007 has grown to encompass a broad portfolio around the world including currency trading, raw materials and other commodities.
The company's investment strategies have been based on analysis of real or perceived macroeconomic trends in various countries.

The SLZ Group's portfolio of interests includes more than 50 companies in 15 countries. 
The company has offices in China, Switzerland, United Kingdom, European Union, Bermuda, Barbados, France and Israel.

See also
Leveraged buyout
Currency trading
Commodity trading
Raw materials

External links 
 Official website

Financial services companies of Switzerland
Privately held companies of Switzerland